The 2022–23 season is the 98th season in the existence of FC Zenit Saint Petersburg and the club's 27th consecutive season in the top flight of Russian football. In addition to the domestic league, Zenit Saint Petersburg are participating in this season's editions of the Russian Cup. The club won the Russian Super Cup before the season with their participation in the UEFA Champions League still on hold due to the ongoing Russian conflict with Ukraine.

Squad

Transfers

In

Loans in

Out

Loans out

Competitions

Overall record

Premier League

League table

Results summary

Results

Russian Super Cup

Russian Cup
On 12 August 2022, the Russian Football Union announced a new format with modifications to both the group and knockout phases. As Zenit have previously been involved in European completion, the new format change marked the club's first participation in the (now-expanded) group stage since its addition to the competition in 2020.

Group stage

Knockout stage

Squad statistics

Goal scorers

References

External links
  

FC Zenit Saint Petersburg seasons
Zenit Saint Petersburg